Charles Sandys Stuart Shipley Packer (1810–1883), commonly referred to as Charles S. Packer, was an Australian classical music composer, born in Reading, Berkshire, England. He was a graduate of The Royal Academy of Music in London. Packer was convicted of embezzlement and sentenced to penal transportation to Tasmania in 1839 on the ship Mangles. On release, he became a successful teacher and performer In 1863, he was convicted of bigamy and sentenced to five years' imprisonment in Darlinghurst Gaol with hard labour.

He was accompanist to the Sydney Choral Society, of which Joseph Massey sen. was conductor, meeting at the Sydney School of Arts, and which performed the Handel oratorios Messiah and Judas Maccabaeus with some success.

Works
 1855 City of Sydney Polka 
 Reminiscence of the garden palace
 The crown of thorns : an oratorio
 The royal Charlie polka
 The song of the angels
 Exchange ball schottische
 The captive's child : ballad
 Arm! arm! : Australian patriotic song)
 Little Nell : a ballad
 My Johnny was a shoemaker
 Lily Lee (arrangement)
 Queen of the west : new ballad (orchestration) 
 Australia hail! Australian national hymn

Recordings
 1999 Classical Music Of Colonial Australia - Polka

References

1810 births
1883 deaths
Australian conductors (music)
Australian male composers
Australian composers
English emigrants to Australia
Australian poets
Alumni of the Royal College of Music
19th-century male musicians
People convicted of bigamy